The 2013 African U-17 Women's World Cup Qualifying Tournament was the 4th edition of the African U-17 Women's World Cup Qualifying Tournament, the biennial international youth football competition organised by the Confederation of African Football (CAF) to determine which women's under-17 national teams from Africa qualify for the FIFA U-17 Women's World Cup.

The tournament was  played on a home and away knockout basis. 10 teams entered the competition. The pairings were released in late June 2013.
The first round's many withdrawal of teams was openly criticised by FIFA.

The top three teams of the tournament Ghana, Nigeria and Zambia qualified for the 2014 FIFA U-17 Women's World Cup in Costa Rica as the CAF representatives.

First round
The matches took place in the first week of August and September. Nigeria and South Africa received a bye this round.

|}

1 : Kenya withdrew from the game and Equatorial Guinea moved on.
2 : Congo did not show up for the first leg. Consequently, CAF cancelled the second leg and Ghana moved on to the next round.
3 : Morocco apparently withdrew from the competition. South Sudan moved to the next round.

Second round
Nigeria and South Africa were the top seeded teams and received a bye to the first round. Matches were played in November. The three winners qualified to the 2014 FIFA U-17 Women's World Cup. Nigeria due to withdrawal of South Sudan from the Competition. Ghana on a 5–2 aggregate against Equatorial Guinea. Zambia booked their world cup ticket after a 3–1 win against South Africa.

|}

1 : South Sudan withdrew from the competition and Nigeria got qualified for the 2014 FIFA U-17 Women's World Cup.

References

External links
African Women U-17 Qualifying Tournament 2013 - rsssf.com

African U-17 Cup of Nations for Women
CAF
wom
2013 in youth association football